The NWA Southeastern Junior Heavyweight Championship was a secondary title for wrestlers considered "Junior Heavyweights", that is weighing under 230 lbs. It was promoted in the Alabama, Florida, Tennessee and Mississippi region from 1975 until 1989, first by Southeastern Championship Wrestling from 1975 to 1985 then by its successor Continental Championship Wrestling from 1985 to 1988 and finally by the Continental Wrestling Federation between 1988 and 1989.

Title history

Footnotes

References

National Wrestling Alliance championships
Continental Championship Wrestling championships
Junior heavyweight wrestling championships
United States regional professional wrestling championships